Moustapha Kassem (born 1959) is a scientist, physician and endocrinologist based in Denmark. He received his medical degree from Kasr-el-Aini Medical School, Cairo University, Egypt (1985) and received his post-graduate  training in internal medicine and endocrinology in Denmark and the United States. He obtained  his PhD degree (1994) and DSc degrees (1998) from Aarhus University.

He had a post-doctoral  fellowship at the Mayo Clinic,  Rochester, MN, USA where he worked with professor B. L. Riggs. Moustapha Kassem's research focus is mechanisms of bone formation  and stem cell  differentiation into skeletal tissues.  He combines methodologies of clinical medicine with state-of-the-art technologies  of cell and molecular biology. Moustapha Kassem has developed normal  and immortalized cell lines  for studying human skeletal (mesenchymal) stem cells and their  differentiation potential. Moustapha Kassem has also studied aging of  bone cells and the effects of donor age on their biological functions.  Moustapha Kassem is a co-founder of Stem Cell Treatment Center at Odense University Hospital,  where stem cell therapy is being introduced into clinical  practice and PhD graduate school of Stem Cells and Related Technologies.

References

External links 
 Syddansk Universitet profile
 http://www.sdu.dk/Om_SDU/Institutter_centre/Klinisk_institut/Forskning/Forskningsenheder/MedicinskEndokrinologi/Forskningsomraader/Kassem%20gruppen/Principal%20Investigator.aspx

Danish scientists
Egyptian scientists
Danish endocrinologists
Stem cell researchers
1959 births
Living people
Aarhus University alumni
Cairo University alumni